Tony Steward may refer to:

Tony Steward (cricketer) (1941–2002), South African cricketer
Tony Steward (American football) (born 1992), American football linebacker

See also
Tony Stewart